Chaetopoa is a genus of African plants in the grass family, found only in Tanzania.

 Species
 Chaetopoa pilosa Clayton - Mbeya Region in southwestern Tanzania
 Chaetopoa taylorii C.E.Hubb. - Tanzania

See also 
 List of Poaceae genera

References 

Panicoideae
Poaceae genera
Endemic flora of Tanzania
Grasses of Africa
Taxa named by Charles Edward Hubbard